Liam Neale (born ) is an English rugby union player, who played as openside flanker for Northampton Saints.

Liam then went to Nottingham Medical School where he graduated as one of the top students in 2015. He now works as a Doctor for the NHS.

References

Living people
English rugby union players
Northampton Saints players
Rugby union flankers
1989 births
Place of birth missing (living people)
People educated at Colchester Royal Grammar School